The 1947 European Rowing Championships were rowing championships held on the Rotsee in the Swiss city of Lucerne. The competition was for men only, they competed in all seven Olympic boat classes (M1x, M2x, M2-, M2+, M4-, M4+, M8+), and 15 nations participated. It was the first European Rowing Championships held after World War II, and it was the second time that the regatta was held on the Rotsee; the previous regatta was in 1934.

Medal summary – men's events

References

European Rowing Championships
Rowing
Sport in Lucerne
European Rowing Championships
Rowing